Jezera, meaning "Lakes" in several Slavic languages, may refer to:

 Jezera, Teslić, a village in the municipality of Teslić, Bosnia and Herzegovina
 Jezera, Tisno, a village in the municipality of Tisno, Croatia

See also 

 Jezero (disambiguation)